John Óge Lynch was Mayor of Galway from 1551-52.

Lynch was mayor at a time of unrest in Connacht and Munster provoked by the Irish spy George Paris, and a French agent, M. de Botte. Despite fears to the contrary, no invasion or uprising occurred in Galway.

References
 History of Galway, James Hardiman, Galway, 1820.
 Old Galway, Maureen Donovan O'Sullivan, 1942.
 Henry, William (2002). Role of Honour: The Mayors of Galway City 1485-2001. Galway: Galway City Council.  
 Martyn, Adrian (2016). The Tribes of Galway: 1124-1642

Mayors of Galway
16th-century Irish politicians